The Estero Auco is a river located in Chile. The river passes through Las Chinchillas National Reserve, but does not pass through any major city within Choapa Province.

See also
List of rivers of Chile

References
 EVALUACION DE LOS RECURSOS HIDRICOS SUPERFICIALES EN LA CUENCA DEL RIO BIO BIO

Rivers of Chile
Rivers of Coquimbo Region